The Mid Atlantic Terascale Partnership (MATP) was a consortium cofounded by the University of Virginia and Virginia Tech to facilitate access to the National LambdaRail in Virginia, Maryland, and Washington DC. MATP members had NLR member network access rights through a license granted by the Virginia Tech Foundation. MATP also provided a forum for collaboration for terascale computing and high performance networking among members. Membership was open to any university, government agency, or commercial research institution in the mid-atlantic region.

MATP operated an NLR network access facility in McLean Virginia. This facility provides access to NLR's Layer2 and Layer3 networks as well as Internet2's Abilene Network and commodity Internet services for member participants.

Past members (as of December 2005) included:

College of William and Mary
George Mason University
J. Craig Venter Institute
NASA
Oak Ridge Associated Universities (associate member)
Old Dominion University
Southeastern Universities Research Association (SURA) on behalf of Jefferson Lab (DOE) and other SURA programs
University of Virginia
Virginia Commonwealth University
Virginia Tech

Virginia Tech
College of William & Mary
George Mason University
NASA groups, organizations, and centers
Old Dominion University
University of Virginia
Virginia Commonwealth University